The North Carolina A&T Aggies baseball team represents the North Carolina Agricultural and Technical State University in NCAA Division I college baseball.  They compete in the Colonial Athletic Association. The Aggies play their home games at War Memorial Stadium, and are currently coached by Ben Hall.

Venue

The Aggie baseball program plays all home contests in War Memorial Stadium. The stadium, which was built in 1926, has a capacity of 7,500. The stadium has served as the home of various local minor league baseball clubs from the 1930s to 2004.

Team achievements
North Carolina A&T joined the Mid-Eastern Athletic Conference as a founding member in 1969. Before that, the Aggies were members of the Division II Central Intercollegiate Athletic Conference (CIAA), where they won 14 conference titles, including a six-season streak from 1950 to 1955. Since joining the MEAC, A&T has claimed 3 conference titles.

Notable players

Many North Carolina A&T Aggie players have gone on to play baseball in Major, Minor, and Negro leagues. Of the 18 Aggie baseball players that have been selected in the Major League Baseball draft, Lloyd Lightfoot holds the distinction of being the highest drafted at #214 to the Baltimore Orioles in 1968.

Aggie baseball players that have gone on to play professionally include: Negro league players Edward Martin, James Robinson & Hubert "Burt" Simmons and Major league players Tom Alston & Al Holland. Other notable former Aggie baseball players include: Hugh Evans who later transitioned into officiating for the NBA and Artis Stanfield, the first African-American to win the NCAA batting championship.  2019 graduate Dawnoven Smith currently plays plays professionally for the Utica Unicorns of the United Shore Professional Baseball League.

Coaches

Head coaches
The current coach of the Aggies is Ben Hall. Prior to joining NC A&T, Hall held previous assistant coaching positions at Winthrop University and Wingate University.

See also
 List of NCAA Division I baseball programs

References

 
1902 establishments in North Carolina
Baseball teams established in 1902